Raymond Clifford Phelps (December 11, 1903 in Dunlap, Tennessee – July 7, 1971 in Fort Pierce, Florida) was a pitcher in Major League Baseball. He pitched from 1930 to 1936.

External links

1903 births
1971 deaths
Baseball players from Tennessee
Major League Baseball pitchers
Brooklyn Robins players
Chicago White Sox players
Chattanooga Lookouts players
Danville Leafs players
High Point Pointers players
Jacksonville Tars players
Albany Nuts players
Minneapolis Millers (baseball) players
Jersey City Skeeters players
Montreal Royals players
St. Paul Saints (AA) players
Fort Pierce Bombers players
Knoxville Smokies players
People from Dunlap, Tennessee